Raymond Black Jr. (born May 17, 1991) is an American professional stock car racing driver. He last competed full-time in the NASCAR Xfinity Series, driving the No. 07 Chevrolet Camaro for SS-Green Light Racing.

Racing career
Born in Montgomery, Alabama, he moved to Palm Coast, Florida when he was nine years old. After playing racing video games on his PlayStation, Black developed an interest in racing professionally at age 14. In 2006, Black began racing in the Florida Mini Cup Racing Association's Junior All-Star division, winning the championship after finishing in the top five in every race. In 2013, he began racing Pro Late Models.

Camping World Truck Series
In 2014, Black made his NASCAR Camping World Truck Series debut at Martinsville Speedway for SS-Green Light Racing, driving the No. 07. Due to qualifying being rained out, Black started 29th based on his team's owners points standing in 2013. Black finished 24th, five laps behind race winner Matt Crafton. Black made six additional starts for the team in 2014, with a best finish of 18th at Chicagoland Speedway and Texas Motor Speedway, the former being where he led his only lap of the season.

On December 16, Black announced he would compete full-time in the Truck Series with SS-Green Light for 2015, competing for Rookie of the Year honors. In the season-opening race at Daytona International Speedway, Black finished fifth after avoiding a crash on the backstretch. After not finishing in the top ten for the rest of the season, but rarely finishing outside the top twenty, he managed an eleventh-place points finish.

Xfinity Series

In November 2015, Black made his Xfinity Series debut at Texas, driving the No. 15 for Rick Ware Racing. On January 13, 2016, Black announced he would drive the No. 07 Chevrolet Camaro full-time for SS-Green Light Racing. He finished nineteenth in his debut season, failing to break in to the top ten in any races.

After starting the 2017 NASCAR Xfinity Series season with SS-Green Light, Black was replaced by Todd Bodine for the Charlotte race in 2017 due to a lack of sponsorship. Spencer Boyd, Korbin Forrister, Andy Lally, Ryan Ellis and Devin Jones also ran in the 07 when Black could not bring sponsorship. Boyd took over the ride that Black ran 21 of the 33 races in 2017 for 2018 with funding from Grunt Style.

After losing his ride with Ware in the Cup Series, Black returned with B. J. McLeod Motorsports at Daytona in 2018. The team failed to qualify along with five other cars. Black returned to the Xfinity Series sporadically in summer 2018, with Isokern Fireplaces as his sponsor.

In January 2019, it was announced that Black would compete full-time in 2019, driving the No. 07 car for SS-Green Light Racing.

Black began the 2020 season by scoring his first career Xfinity top-ten finish, avoiding late crashes to finish eighth at Daytona. Despite enjoying a strong start to the year with an average finish of 18.6 across the first five races, he withdrew from full-time racing in late May to help his sponsor and father's business CDA Technical Institute, which was struggling financially due to the COVID-19 pandemic.

Monster Energy Cup Series
In September 2017, Black joined Rick Ware Racing's No. 51 Monster Energy NASCAR Cup Series car at Chicagoland's Tales of the Turtles 400. After qualifying 39th, he finished 40th, 16 laps behind race winner Martin Truex Jr. He made two more starts in the Playoffs, finishing 34th at Texas and 38th at Homestead. On November 22, 2017, Black joined the RWR team for a full 2018 Monster Energy NASCAR Cup Series season and a Rookie of the Year effort. However the deal fell through later in the offseason, as Black's family, which owned reported sponsor ScubaLife, allegedly backed out of the commitment in December.

Despite no longer having a deal to drive full-time in the Cup Series for Ware, he did drive RWR's No. 51 Chevrolet Camaro Zl1 for the 2018 Coke Zero Sugar 400, with a 16th-place finish. It is worth mentioning, that Black's car was serviced by two female pit crew members, for the first time in NASCAR Cup Series history.

Motorsports career results

NASCAR
(key) (Bold – Pole position awarded by qualifying time. Italics – Pole position earned by points standings or practice time. * – Most laps led.)

Monster Energy Cup Series

Xfinity Series

Camping World Truck Series

 Season still in progress
 Ineligible for series points

References

External links

 
 

Living people
1991 births
Sportspeople from Montgomery, Alabama
NASCAR drivers
Racing drivers from Alabama